John Fuller represented Dedham, Massachusetts in the Great and General Court. He was also town clerk for a total of four years, having first been elected in 1690. Also beginning in 1690, he began the first of his five terms as selectman.

References

Works cited

Members of the colonial Massachusetts General Court from Dedham
Year of birth missing
Year of death missing
Dedham, Massachusetts selectmen
Dedham Town Clerks